Véronique Marie Alice Henriette De Keyser (born 23 March 1945 in Brussels) is a Belgian politician who served as a Member of the European Parliament from 2001 until 2014. She is a member of the Parti Socialiste, part of the Socialist Group

De Keyser majored in Psychology at the Université Libre de Bruxelles (1968) and has a doctorate in work psychology (1974).

In parliament, De Keyser served on the Committee on Foreign Affairs. She was also a substitute for the Committee on Women's Rights and Gender Equality and the Committee on the Internal Market and Consumer Protection.

Mandates
 Member of the European Parliament (from 2001)
 Municipal councillor of Liège (since 2006)
 Named Head of Election Observation Mission in Palestine in 2005 for the 2006 elections
 Named Head of Election Observation Mission in Sudan in 2010 for the 2010 elections
 Named Head of Election Observation Mission in South Sudan in 2011 for the 2011 referendum

Education
 1968: Degree in psychology, Free University of Brussels (ULB)
 1974: Doctorate in work psychology with Approche psychologique de l'expérience ouvrière à travers les systèmes

Career
 1968-1984: Researcher in psychology at the ULB and the Brussels Industrial Study and Research Centre
 1984: Junior lecturer at the University of Liège
 1988: Lecturer at the University of Liège
 1990-1998: Dean of the Psychology and Education Science Faculty at the University of Liège
 Visiting lecturer at the Universities of Oporto, Moscow and Toulouse-Le Mirail
 1990-1994: President of the Belgian Psychology Society
 1995-2016: Administrator at the King Baudouin Foundation
 2001-2014: Member of the European Parliament
 1997-2003: President of the European Work and Organisational Psychology Association

See also
 2004 European Parliament election in Belgium

Academics
Work psychology professor at the University of Liège and former Dean of the faculty of Psychology, municipal councilor of Liège, she has become a specialist in work conditions, stress, labour, and specifically labour of young people.  She denounces, through her political action and her writings, the degrading conditions of workers and work in Europe of this past decade.

Politics
In the June 2009 elections, Véronique De Keyser was elected for her third mandate as member of the European Parliament, and at the same time beginning her first mandate as vice-president of the Socialists and Democrats (S&D) Group.  She is a member of the EP Committee on Development (DEVE), the EP Subcommittee on Human Rights (DROI), the delegation to the ACP-EU Joint Parliamentary Assembly, the delegation for relations with the Palestinian Legislative Council, and is a substitute for the Committee on Foreign Affairs.

In 2001, Véronique De Keyser became a Member of the European Parliament, a position which followed a long international scientific career. She began her studies at the Université Libre de Bruxelles in Psychology, where she obtained her doctorate in work psychology in 1974. She will then first be in charge of classes in the University of Liège in 1984, then Ordinary Professor in 1988 and finally dean of the Faculty of Psychology from 1990 to 1998.  Her academic career – which will see her become an internationally recognised specialist in applied research in security and human reliability in risk environments as well as in ergonomics – will allow her to build bridges between a variety of scientific communities and to develop academic collaborations with the United States of America, Russia, South America and Africa.  She was president of the "European Work and Organizational Psychology Association" (EAWOP), president of the Ergonomics Society of the French Language, and director of the Excellency Center of the University of Liège on the modeling of temporal reasoning in dynamic situations.  She has written over one hundred articles and many scientific works.

Throughout her scientific career, Véronique De Keyser maintained a strong political commitment in the Belgian Socialist Party.  She will enter the European Parliament for her first mandate on 12 September 2001, in the wake of the 9/11 terror attacks in New York City.  She then became a member of the Committee on External Affairs and substitute in the Committee on Environment. She is vigorously outspoken against the American intervention in Irak, and will voice her political commitment very early on regarding issues such as the Arab world, the Middle East, human rights issues, women's rights, will go on missions regularly to Syria, Palestine, and in all the countries of Mashrek, the Middle East and the Arab Peninsula.  In the end of 2005, during her second mandate, she is named Head of the Election Observation Mission in Palestine in 2005 for the 2006 elections.

During her third term as Member of the European Parliament, Véronique De Keyser continues to fight in favour of the peoples of the Southern Mediterranean on the eve of the Arab Spring. She also turns towards Africa and development policies of the EU.  She will, once again, be named Head of the Election Observation Mission in Sudan in 2010 for the presidential, legislative and local elections, and once more for the South Sudan independence referendum of July 2011.

In the European Parliament, her work carried on with countries in democratic transition (Arab Spring), especially on the Middle East, Syria, Palestine, and conflict regions of Africa.  She has defended democracy, peace, reinforcement of fragiles states, consolidation of progressive parties, women's rights, humanities, the fight against torture and in particular that of children, the fight against using children as soldiers, and against child sorcers.

Titles and awards
 1986: NATO Science Award
 1988: Chevalier de l'Ordre de Léopold
 1996: Prix Santé et Entreprises
 1997: Commandeur de l'Ordre de la Couronne
 1999: Maria Sibylla-Merian prize awarded to women scientists for their outstanding achievements mainly in the natural and technical sciences, as well as in medicine
 2011: Théroigne de Méricourt prize of Walloon Synergy

Bibliography
 De Keyser, V., Qvale, T., Wilpert, B., & Ruiz Quintanilla, S.A (Eds)(1988) The Meaning of Work and Technology Option. Wiley & Sons
 De Keyser, V. & Van Daele, A. (Eds)(1989). The ergonomics of conception. Editions De Boeck
 Cellier, J.M., De Keyser, V, & Valot, C. (1996) La Gestion du temps dans les environnements dynamiques, Presses Universitaires de France
 De Keyser, V. & Leonova, A. (2001) – Human error prevention and well being at work in Western Europe and Russia, Kluwer Publisher
 De Keyser, V. (2002) – Human Error, Editions Labor
 De Keyser, V. (2003) – To life and to death, Editions Labor
 De Keyser, V. (2008) – Petits crimes sans importance. Critiques de la flexibilité au travail en Europe, Editions Luc Pire
 Hessel, S. & De Keyser, V. (2013) – Palestine, the European betrayal, Editions Fayard
 Thesis in psychology, 1974 – Psychological approach of workers' experience through automated systems.

External links
 Personal Website
 
 

1945 births
Living people
Socialist Party (Belgium) MEPs
Belgian socialist feminists
MEPs for Belgium 1999–2004
MEPs for Belgium 2004–2009
MEPs for Belgium 2009–2014
20th-century women MEPs for Belgium
21st-century women MEPs for Belgium
Articles containing video clips
Free University of Brussels (1834–1969) alumni
Belgian psychologists
Belgian women psychologists
Academic staff of the University of Liège